This is a list of buildings that are examples of the Art Deco architectural style in Colorado, United States.

Aurora 
 Aurora Fox Arts Center, Aurora, 1946
 Fitzsimons Army Medical Center, Aurora, 1941
 KOA Building, Aurora, 1932

Boulder 
 Boulder County Courthouse, Boulder, 1933
 Boulder Theater, Boulder, 1906, 1935
 Boulder High School, Boulder, 1937
 Glen Huntington Band Shell, Boulder, 1938

Colorado Springs 
 Colorado Springs Fine Arts Center, Colorado Springs, 1936
 Colorado Springs School District 11 Administration Building, Colorado Springs
 General William J. Palmer High School, Colorado Springs, 1940
 Kimball's Peak Three Theater (former Peak Theater), Colorado Springs, 1935
 Morrison Brothers Market, Colorado Springs, 1936
 Municipal Utilities Building, Colorado Springs, 1931
 Peterson Air and Space Museum, Colorado Springs, 1942

Denver 
 1575 Vine, Denver, 1947
 2383 Jasmine Street, Denver, 1940
 A. B. Hirschfeld Press Building, Denver, 1949
 American Woodmen Life Building, Denver, 1950
 Bluebird Theater, Denver, 1914
 Bryant Webster Elementary School, Highland, Denver, 1931
 Buerger Brothers Building, Denver, 1929
 Colorado Coalition for the Homeless, Denver 1930s
 Colorado State Capitol Annex Building and Boiler Plant, Capitol Hill, Denver, 1939
 Denver Wastewater Management Building, Denver, 1993
 Detroit Terraces, Denver
 Dorset House, Denver, 1937
 The Elm, Denver, 1930s
 Emerson Apartments, Poet's Row, Denver, 1930s
 Emily Dickinson Building, Poet's Row, Denver, 1956
 Eugene Field Building, Poet's Row, Denver, 1939
 Fire Station No. 11, Denver, 1937
 Horace Mann Middle School, Denver 1931
 Hotel Monaco (former Albany Hotel), Denver, 1930s
 James Russell Lowell Building, Poet's Row, Denver, 1936
 Katherine Mullen Memorial Home for Nurses (now Mullen Building, Saint Joseph Hospital Foundation), Denver, 1936
 Leeman Auto Company Building, Denver, 1932
 Leetonia Apartments, Denver, 1930
 Louisa May Alcott Building, Poet's Row, Denver, 1931
 Marianne Apartments, Denver, 1930s
 Mark Twain Apartments, Poet's Row, Denver, 1937
 Mayan Theater, Denver, 1930
 Midwest Steel & Iron Works, Denver, 1930
 Mountain States Telephone Building, Denver, 1929
 Nathaniel Hawthorne Building, Poet's Row, Denver, 1938
 Nordlund House, Denver, 1939
 Oxford Hotel Cruise Room, Denver, 1891 and 1933
 Paramount Theatre, Denver, 1930
 Railway Exchange New Building, Denver, 1937
 Robert Browning Apartments, Poet's Row, Denver, 1937
 Robert Frost Building, Poet's Row, Denver, 1929
 Robert W. Steele Elementary School, Denver 1929
 Rose-Adell Apartments, 970 Pennsylvania, Denver, 1940
 Shangri-La, Denver, 1938
 Sherman Arms Building, Poet's Row, Denver, 1950
 Smiley's Laundromat, Denver, 1932
 Thomas Carlyle Building, Poet's Row, Denver, 1936
 University Building, Denver, 1929
 Washington Irving Apartments, Poet's Row, Denver, 1936

Fort Collins 
 Beebe Clinic Building, Fort Collins
 Fort Collins Municipal Power Plant Fountain, Fort Collins, 1936
 Northern Hotel, Fort Collins, 1936
 Student Services Building, Colorado State University, Fort Collins, 1948

Fort Morgan 
 Farmers State Bank Building, Fort Morgan, 1930
 Fort Morgan Fire Department, Fort Morgan
 Fort Morgan Power Plan, Fort Morgan, 1952
 Morgan County Courthouse and Jail, Fort Morgan, 1921 and 1936

Lakewood 
 Davies Chuck Wagon Diner, Lakewood, 1957
 Ethel's Beauty Salon and Gil's Barber Shop, Heritage Lakewood Belmar Park, Lakewood
 Jeffco Open High School, Lakewood
 Lakewood Theatre, Lakewood, 1948
 Peerless Gas Station, Heritage Lakewood Belmar Park, Lakewood
 Sno White Dry Cleaners, Lakewood, 1948
 Sobesky Academy, Lakewood

Other cities 
 Benevolent and Protective Order of Elks Lodge, Montrose, 1927
 Burlington Gymnasium, Burlington, 1941
 Chaffee County Courthouse, Salida, 1931
 Chaka Theater, Julesburg, 1919
 Cliff Theater, Wray, 1950
 Custer County Courthouse, Westcliffe, 1929
 Del Norte Grade School, Del Norte, 1942
 Eagle County Courthouse, Eagle
 Egyptian Theatre, Delta, 1933
 Fruita Middle School, Fruita
 Gothic Theatre, Englewood, 1920s
 Greeley Junior High School, Greeley, 1938
 Haskin Medical Building, Center, 1940s
 Heister House, Salida, 1943
 Hugo Municipal Pool, Hugo, 1938
 Husung Hardware Building (now KENY TV), Alamosa, 1936
 Isis Theater, Victor, 1896, 1920s
 Kim Schools, Kim, 1934
 La Jara Elementary School, La Jara, 1930s
 Lakeside Amusement Park, Lakeside, 1930s
 Lamar Theater, Lamar, 1920
 Montrose City Hall, Montrose, 1926
 Municipal Building, Gunnison, 1931
 Phillips County Courthouse, Holyoke, 1935
 Rialto Theater, Loveland, 1920
 Revere High School, Ovid, 1928
 S. H. Kress and Co. Building, (now Business and Technology Center), Pueblo, 1930
 St. Agnes Catholic Church, Saguache, 1950
 Sedgwick County Courthouse, Julesburg, 1939
 Sim Hudson Motor Company Building, Burlington, 1932
 Trojan Theater, Longmont, 1939
 Union High School, Westminster, 1939
 United States Post Office, Florence, 1936
 Ute Theatre, Saguache, 1916

See also 
 List of Art Deco architecture
 List of Art Deco architecture in the United States

References 

 "Art Deco & Streamline Moderne Buildings." Roadside Architecture.com. Retrieved 2019-01-03.
 Cinema Treasures. Retrieved 2022-09-06
 "Court House Lover". Flickr. Retrieved 2022-09-06
 "The Encyclopedia of Arkansas History and Culture". Archived from the original on 2019-01-04. Retrieved 2019-01-04.
 "New Deal Map". The Living New Deal. Retrieved 2020-12-25.
 "New York Registry & Map – Art Deco Society of New York". Archived from the original on 2019-01-03. Retrieved 2019-01-03
 "SAH Archipedia". Society of Architectural Historians. Retrieved 2021-11-21.

External links
 

 
Art Deco
Art Deco architecture in Colorado
Colorado-related lists